Blunkett salad is a Tunisian salad typically consists of bread, horseradish, eggs and tuna.

See also
 List of Arabic salads

References

Arab cuisine
Salads